Chakwal District  (Punjabi and ) is in Pothohar Plateau of Punjab, Pakistan. It is located in the north of the Punjab province, Chakwal district is bordered by Khushab to its south, Rawalpindi to its north east, Jhelum to its east, Mianwali to its west and Attock to its north west. The district was created out of parts of Jhelum and Attock in 1985.

History
During British rule, Chakwal was a tehsil of Jhelum district, the population according to the 1891 census of India was 164,912 which had fallen to 160,316 in 1901. It contained the towns of Chakwal and Bhaun and 248 villages. The land revenue and cesses amounted in 1903-4 to 3–300,000. The predominantly Muslim population supported Muslim League and Pakistan Movement. After the independence of Pakistan in 1947, the minority Hindus and Sikhs migrated to India while the Muslims refugees from India settled down in the area of Chakwal later it was upgraded as a District on 1st of July 1985.

Administrative divisions
The district of Chakwal, which covers an area of 6,524 km2, is subdivided into five tehsils. These tehsils were formerly part of neighbouring districts:

 Chakwal Tehsil was annexed from Jhelum District and made part of the newly formed Chakwal District.
 Choa Saidan Shah was carved out of sub-division Pind Dadan Khan of Jhelum District and was amalgamated with sub-division Chakwal. Choa Saidan Shah was upgraded to the level of a sub-division in 1993.

The district is administratively subdivided into three tehsils and 45 union councils.

Constituencies
There is one district council, one municipal committees — Chakwal — and two town committees — Choa Saidan Shah and Kallar Kahar.

The district is represented in the National Assembly by two constituencies: NA-60 and NA-61. The district is represented in the provincial assembly by four elected MPAs and in National Assembly by two MNAs who represent the following constituencies:

Geography
Chakwal district borders the districts of Rawalpindi and Attock in the north, Jhelum in the east, Khushab in the south and Mianwali in the west.

Demography
At the time of the 2017 census the district had a population of 1,495,463, of which 723,178 were males and 772,166 females. Rural population is 1,211,855 (81.03%) while the urban population is 283,608 (18.96%). The literacy rate was 74.64% for the population 10 years and above: 84.64% for males and 65.57% for females. Muslims made up almost the entire population with 99.67%, with the minorities being 3,700 Christians and 960 Ahmadis. Hindus number around 190.

At the time of the 2017 census, 93.35% of the population spoke Punjabi, 4.40% Pashto and 1.63% Urdu as their first language.

The local Punjabi dialects are Dhani and Awankari.

Education
Chakwal has a total of 1,199 government schools out of which 52 percent (627 schools) are for female students. The district has an enrollment of 181,574 in public sector schools.

Educational institutions
Educational institutions in the Chakwal District include:

 Government Post Graduate College (Chakwal)
  University Of Chakwal

Notable people
 Yahya Khan, former President of Pakistan, was born in Chakwal city in 1917.
 Manmohan Singh, former Prime Minister of India, was born in Gah village (formerly part of Jhelum District)
 Khudadad Khan, VC, British Indian Army.
 Malik Nur Khan, was a three-star air officer, politician, sports administrator, and the Commander-in-Chief of the Pakistan Air Force, serving under President Ayub Khan from 1965 until 1969.
 Muhammad Safdar, Lt. General Muhammad Safdar is the former Governor of Punjab, having served from 1999 to 2001. He has also previously served as the ambassador to Morocco and the Vice-Chancellor of the University of Punjab until 1993.
 Colonel Imam – Brigadier Sultan Amir Tarar was a one-star rank army general in the Pakistan Army, member of the Special Service Group (SSG) of the army, and an intelligence officer of the Inter-Services Intelligence (ISI).

See also

 Chakwal
 Rawalpindi Division
 Chakwal railway station
 North Western State Railway
 Districts of Pakistan
 Punjab, Pakistan
 Mandra–Bhaun Railway
 Swaik Lake (Khandowa Lake)

References

Bibliography

External links 

 
Districts of Punjab, Pakistan
1985 establishments in Pakistan